Sherratt may refer to:

People
Andrew Sherratt (1946–2006), English archaeologist
Brian Sherratt (educator) (born 1942), Headmaster of Great Barr School in Birmingham, England (1984–2005)
Brian Sherratt (footballer) (born 1944), footballer
John Sherratt (born 1923), English former amateur footballer
Robert Simon Sherratt, British engineer

Other
Sherratt & Hughes or Bowes & Bowes, bookselling and publishing company based in Cambridge, England
Sherratt Bay, bay between Cape Melville and Penguin Island on the south side of King George Island, in the South Shetland Islands

See also
Cherat
Sarratt
Sharratt
Surratt